Hoshikawa Station may refer to:
Hoshikawa Station (Kanagawa) in Kanagawa, Japan connected with the Sagami Railway Main Line
Hoshikawa Station (Mie) in Mie, Japan connected with the Sangi Railway Hokusei Line